The 1943 Adapazarı–Hendek earthquake occurred at 17:32 local time on 20 June in Sakarya Province, Turkey. It registered 6.6 on the surface wave magnitude scale with a maximum intensity of IX (Violent) on the Mercalli intensity scale.

See also
 List of earthquakes in 1943
 List of earthquakes in Turkey

References

External links

1943 Adapazari
1943 earthquakes
1943 in Turkey
History of Sakarya Province
June 1943 events
1943 disasters in Turkey